The Presbyterian Church in Korea (PyungAhn) is a Reformed denomination in South Korea. It had almost 2,000 members and 43 congregations in 2004. The apostles Creed and Westminster Confession are the standards.

References 

Presbyterian denominations in South Korea
Presbyterian denominations in Asia